Lament over the Dead Christ is a c.1548 oil-on-canvas painting by Paolo Veronese, now in the Museo di Castelvecchio in Verona.

It was commissioned by Hieronymite monks for the church of Santa Maria delle Grazie and completed in 1548, the same year as Bevilacqua-Lazise Altarpiece (now in the same museum). A 19th-century copy of Lament now hangs in the church of San Massimo all'Adige in Venice.

References

Veronese
Paintings by Paolo Veronese
Paintings in the collection of the Castelvecchio Museum
1548 paintings